Norte de Almería is a Spanish geographical indication for Vino de la Tierra wines located in the autonomous region of Andalusia. Vino de la Tierra is one step below the mainstream Denominación de Origen indication on the Spanish wine quality ladder.

The area covered by this geographical indication comprises the following municipalities: Chirivel, María, Vélez-Blanco and Vélez-Rubio, in the north of the province of Almería (Andalusia, Spain).

It acquired its Vino de la Tierra status in 2008.

Grape varieties
 White: Airén, Chardonnay, Macabeo and Sauvignon blanc
 Red: Cabernet Sauvignon, Merlot, Monastrell, Tempranillo and Syrah

The regulations specifically forbid the use of any genetically modified varieties for the production of wines.

References

Spanish wine
Wine regions of Spain
Wine-related lists
Appellations